The phrase "threat or menace" is commonly used in headlines to satirize an unfair prejudice.

News columnists use the phrase frequently. Examples include the LATimes.Com, Forbes and Wired.

It may have been borrowed from the legal phrase "without threat or menace," which is one of many fixed phrases in which two nearly synonymous words are combined, such as "let or hindrance" and "cease and desist."

Early satirical uses of "threat or menace" are in Harvard Lampoon, National Lampoon, and The Amazing Spider-Man.

A misconception is that there was an anti-drug film in the late 1950s/early 1960s called Marijuana: Threat or Menace. However this seems to actually be part of the 1999 documentary "Grass."—done as a satire of anti-marijuana films.

In the Lampoon

In 1968 the Harvard Lampoon published a parody of Life Magazine, which included a story called "Flying Saucers: Threat or Menace".

In July 1971 the National Lampoons cover story was "Pornography; Threat or Menace?"

In Spider-Man

In the universe of the Marvel Comics, publisher J. Jonah Jameson frequently denounces Spider-Man in his newspaper the Daily Bugle.  In The Amazing Spider-Man Annual #15, published in 1981, written by Denny O'Neil and drawn by Frank Miller, the Bugle carries the headline "Spider-Man: Threat or Menace?"

Jameson has used the phrase several times since, including:
Untold Tales of Spider-Man #16, written by Kurt Busiek
Spider-Man (film), 2002
Spectacular Spider-Man (WB Kids cartoon series) - Season 1, episode 9
Marvel's Spider-Man (video game), 2018 - Now a broadcaster, 'Spider-Man: Threat or Menace?' is the title of his latest book

Fans of comics incorrectly assume that Stan Lee introduced the phrase "Threat or Menace" as a headline favored by Jameson while Stan Lee was writing the original issues in the 1960s. According to Kurt Busiek, Lee used the phrase "Spider-Man: Menace" but not the combination.

References

External links
Language Log
Metafilter
alt.usage.english, January 2004

Catchphrases
Popular culture neologisms